The Le Bras (in English: The Arm River) flows through the municipalities of La Pocatière (MRC of Kamouraska Regional County Municipality) and Saint-Roch-des-Aulnaies (MRC of L'Islet Regional County Municipality), in the administrative regions of Bas-Saint-Laurent and Chaudière-Appalaches, at Quebec, in Canada.

The Le Bras River is a tributary of the east bank of the Ferrée River, which flows  further north on the south shore of the St. Lawrence River. This last confluence is located in the small hamlet of Village-des-Aulnaies, located southwest of the village of La Pocatière and northeast of the village of Saint-Roch-des-Aulnaies.

Geography 
The Le Bras river has its source at Bourgelas lake located in La Pocatière. This lake is located near the limit of the municipality of Saint-Onésime-d'Ixworth. Its mouth is located to the north-west.

  towards the southwest in La Pocatière in a forest zone, crossing Lac Perdu to its mouth. This lake is located in a small valley on the east side of Montagne des Marais and on the north side of Coteau Pelé, near the limit of Saint-Roch-des-Aulnaies;
  towards the southwest in a forest zone, up to the limit with Saint-Roch-des-Aulnaies;
  towards the south-west in Saint-Roch-des-Aulnaies in a forest zone, collecting water from the Martin stream, up to the range of Haute-Ville;
  towards the southwest, crossing the rang de la Haute-Ville, then north, to the third Rang East;
  north-west along Route du Moulin, in an agricultural zone, to highway 20;
  north-west, up to its confluence.

The Le Bras river empties on the east bank of the Ferrée river, just south of the route 132 (route de la Seigneurie) bridge, in the hamlet of Village-des-Aulnaies.

Toponymy 
The toponym Le Bras was formalized on December 5, 1968, at the Commission de toponymie du Québec.

See also 
 List of rivers of Quebec

References 

Rivers of Chaudière-Appalaches
Kamouraska Regional County Municipality
L'Islet Regional County Municipality